Lola is a town in the Forest Region of Guinea, near the Liberian border. It is the capital of Lola Prefecture and has a population 60,711 (2008 est).

It is near Mount Nimba, the highest peak in Guinea. It is known for traditional medicine, cloth manufacture and the Timneh parrot.

References 

Sub-prefectures of the Nzérékoré Region